Dato' Sri Devamany s/o. S. Krishnasamy (born 10 September 1958), also known as S. K. Devamany, is a Malaysian politician. He is the incumbent Deputy President of the Malaysian Indian Congress (MIC), a major component party of the Barisan Nasional (BN) coalition. He was a Senator in Dewan Negara; the upper house of the Parliament of Malaysia and served as the Deputy Minister in the Prime Minister's Department (EPU) (2016-2018) in previous government.

Previously he was also the Perak State Legislative Assembly Speaker from 28 June 2013 to 30 June 2016. He formerly served as Deputy Minister in the Prime Minister's Department under the Barisan Nasional government while being member of the Member of Parliament of Malaysia for the Cameron Highlands constituency in Pahang for two terms from 21 March 2004 to 5 May 2013.

Personal life
Devamany was born on 10 September 1957 in Semanggol, Perak and received his early education at King Edward VII School in Taiping. In 1978, he qualified as a teacher from the Special Education Teachers' Institute in Cheras, Kuala Lumpur. He then furthered his studies and graduated with a degree in Malay Literature from University Malaya in 1982.

Dewamany is married to Saraswathy Nallaiah and the couple has three daughters.

Political career
Devamany was picked to be the treasurer general of Malaysian Indian Congress (MIC) replacing Tan Sri Mahalingam in 2008. He becomes MIC current Deputy President after winning the party re-election in 2015 when ROS nullified the 1 December 2013 party's earlier election in which he failed to retain the Vice-President position he previously held since 2009.

Devamany was first elected to the Parliament of Malaysia in the 2004 election for the seat of Cameron Highlands, Pahang.  He held his seat in the 2008 election despite widespread losses by the MIC, leaving him as one of only three MIC members of the Dewan Rakyat.  After the 2008 election, Devamany was appointed a Deputy Minister in the Prime Minister's Department.

For the 2013 Malaysian General Election, Devamany was selected to contest the Sungai Siput, Perak parliamentary constituency. However, he was defeated by incumbent Michael Jeyakumar from Socialist Party of Malaysia (PSM) who had contested under the tickets of People's Justice Party (PKR).

On 28 June 2013, he was voted in as the new Perak State Legislative Assembly Speaker, receiving 31 votes to his opponent's 28. He served as the Perak State Legislative Assembly Speaker from June 2013 to June 2016.

Devamany was appointed as Senator and once again as the Deputy Minister in the Prime Minister's Department (EPU) in the federal government on 27 June 2016.

Election results

References

1958 births
Living people
People from Perak
Malaysian people of Indian descent
Malaysian Indian Congress politicians
Members of the Dewan Negara
Members of the Dewan Rakyat
Speakers of the Perak State Legislative Assembly
University of Malaya alumni
21st-century Malaysian politicians